David L. Huestis (born December 1, 1946) is an American physicist and inventor associated with SRI International. Huestis was awarded the status of Fellow in the American Physical Society, after being nominated by their Division of Atomic, Molecular & Optical Physics in 1990, for "his extensive, broad-ranging theoretical contributions and collaborations with experimentalists leading to fundamental understanding in areas of atomic and molecular excited states, molecular spectroscopy, excimer-laser kinetics, nonlinear optics, and scattering theory."

Huestis has applied for several patents.

Personal life
Huestis is married and lives in Menlo Park, California.

References 

Fellows of the American Physical Society
21st-century American physicists
Living people
1946 births